"Imagine" (stylized in all lowercase) is a song recorded by American singer Ariana Grande. The song was written by Grande, Jameel Roberts and Priscilla Renea alongside its producers Andrew "Pop" Wansel and Happy Perez. It was released on December 14, 2018, as the only promotional single from her fifth studio album Thank U, Next (2019).

Commercially, the song reached the top 10 in Greece, Hungary, Ireland, Malaysia, Singapore, Slovakia and the United Kingdom, as well as the top 20 in Australia, Canada, New Zealand, Portugal and Scotland. The track also peaked at number 21 on the US Billboard Hot 100.

Background and release
On December 11, 2018, Grande teased the song with a post on her Instagram story, with a countdown of its official release. The song was previewed a day later, with Grande tweeting the title using Chinese characters. The song and its official lyric video were released simultaneously on December 14, 2018, with the lyrics set to a glitching background of a collapsing glacier made by glitch artist Thomas Collet.

Composition
"Imagine" is an R&B/pop ballad with a trap-inspired rhythm. It is written in the key of F minor, and has a tempo of 125 BPM. The song features multiple whistle notes, and Grande's vocals span from F3 to C7. Lyrically, the song speaks about Grande's denial of failed relationships, specifically her relationship with Mac Miller. Grande described the song as being about "a simple, beautiful love that is now (and forever) unattainable."

Commercial performance
"Imagine" proved to be Grande's most successful promotional single. On the issue dated December 29, 2018, "Imagine" debuted at number 24 on the US Billboard Hot 100 as the highest new entry of the week, while starting on the Streaming Songs at number 21 and the Digital Songs at number two. "Imagine" fell to number 71 in its second week on the Hot 100, however rebounded and surged to number 63 in its third week. It spent an additional week there and departed the region after four consecutive weeks.
Following the release of Grande's own "7 Rings", "Imagine" re-entered the Billboard Hot 100 at number 99 due to strong digital downloads, spending a fifth week there. After the release of the parent album Thank U, Next, "Imagine" re-entered the US charts for a third time at a new peak of number 21, consequently becoming the sixth highest-charting track from the album and third highest-charting non single behind "Needy" and "NASA" which debuted at numbers 14 and 17 the same week, respectively. The track ultimately charted for a total of eight weeks on the Hot 100.
 
Internationally, "Imagine" reached the top ten in Belgium, Hungary, Ireland, Singapore, Slovakia and the United Kingdom, where it debuted at number eight on the UK Singles Chart. The track also peaked at number 15 on the Australian ARIA Singles Chart, number 16 on the New Zealand Singles Chart, and number 17 on the Canadian Hot 100. Its lowest position was in France, where it reached number 110.

Live performances 
Grande performed "Imagine" for the first time on The Tonight Show Starring Jimmy Fallon on December 18, 2018. The song was excluded from the set list of the Sweetener World Tour because it was "too heavy" to perform, according to Grande. On January 26, 2020, Grande performed the song in a medley with "7 Rings", "My Favorite Things", and "Thank U, Next" at the 62nd Annual Grammy Awards.

Credits and personnel 
Credits adapted from Tidal.

 Ariana Grande – lead vocals, songwriting, vocal production
 Andrew "Pop" Wansel – production, songwriting, keyboard, programming
 Nathan Perez – production, songwriting, guitar, keyboard, programming
 Priscilla Renea – songwriting
 Jameel Roberts – songwriting
 John Hanes – mixing engineer
 Serban Ghenea – mixing
 Brendan Morawski – recording engineer
 Joe Gallagher – recording engineer
 Sean Klein – assistant recording engineer
 Andrew Luftman – production coordinator
 Sarah Shelton – production coordinator
 Zvi Edelman – production coordinator

Charts

Weekly charts

Year-end charts

Certifications

Release history

References

2010s ballads
2018 songs
Contemporary R&B ballads
Pop ballads
Songs written by Ariana Grande
Songs written by Happy Perez
Songs written by Pop Wansel
Songs written by Muni Long